Tarlach Rua Mac Dónaill was an Irish poet.

Tarlach Rua Mac Dónaill was from the townland of Derrylasky in the parish of Donaghmore, County Tyrone, and lived in the first half of the 18th century. He was the author of Seachrán Charn tSiadhail, which became extremely popular in Gaelic Ulster. It survived in numerous oral traditions, two manuscripts, and versions run to over fifty seven verses of eight lines each. The original probably was no more than six. Seachrán Charn tSiadhail describes a young man attempting to impress a young girl with an account of all the professions he has held and all the places he has visited.

According to Aodh Mac Dónaill, Tarlach Rua

"... was shot at the age of 23 by a party of soldiers of Altmore barracks. A remarkable event happened at his death. The old man, his father, came to bring home the corpse of his son. He had an ash twig in his hand and while collecting his son's brains in his cap, he struck the twig in the ground, and forgetting all about it went away carrying his son's corpse. The twig budded and grew into a very large tree. In sixty years it covered a square perch."

References
 Diarmaid Ó Doibhlin (2000) Tyrone's Gaelic Literary Legacy, in Tyrone:History and Society

18th-century deaths
18th-century Irish poets
Irish male poets
Irish-language poets
People from County Tyrone
Year of birth unknown
18th-century Irish male writers